The 1939 Isle of Man Tourist Trophy was the last races until 1947 due to the interruption by World War II. It was also the last of ten Isle of Man TT victories for the 34-year-old Stanley Woods in which he won the Junior TT on a Velocette at 83.19 mph and also finished in 4th place in the Senior TT race. The 250cc Lightweight TT race was a first time winner for Ted Mellors and the Benelli marque. The Senior TT race was won by the German competitor Georg Meier on a supercharged  500CC BMW Type 255  motor-cycle.

The Austrian competitor  Karl Gall riding for the works BMW team crashes at Ballaugh Bridge during an evening practice session and later dies of his injuries and the effects of pneumonia in hospital.

Junior TT (350 cc) Race final standings
Monday 12 June 1939 –  7 laps (264.133 miles) Isle of Man TT Mountain Course

Fastest Lap: Harold Daniels  – 85.05 mph (26’ 38.0) on lap 7.

Lightweight TT (250 cc)  Race final standings
Wednesday 14 June 1939 –  7 laps (264.133 miles) Isle of Man TT Mountain Course

Fastest Lap: Stanley Woods  – 78.16 mph (28’ 58.0)

Senior TT (500cc) Race final standings
Friday  16 June 1939 –  7 laps (264.133 miles) Isle of Man TT Mountain Course

 
Fastest Lap: Georg Meier  – 90.75 mph (24’ 57.0) on lap 2.

Notes
 Improvements to the course include road-widening and landscaping at the Water Works Corner.
 At Sulby during practice, Georg Meier riding for BMW is timed at 111 mph.
 A collision occurs on Bray Hill during lap 2 of the 1939 Junior TT Races when Sven A. Sorenson riding an Excelsior collides with H. B. Waddington and David Whitworth both riding Norton motor-cycles.
 On lap 1 of the 1939 Junior TT Race, Bob Foster riding an AJS stops at the Quarterbridge to fix broken goggles. Also, Bill Beevers and H.B.Myers both riding Velocette motor-cycles crash at the Quarterbridge on the same lap.
 During lap 3 of the Junior Race, Tyrell Smith slips of his Excelsior motor-cycle at Parliament Square in Ramsey and then continues after straightening the foot-rest. At the East Mountain Gate during lap 5, Marcel Simo collides with a post and crashes his Terrot motor-cycle. He suffers head and chest injuries and is taken to hospital. Also during lap 5, Freddie Frith retires at Ballaugh after holding 2nd place in the 1939 Junior TT Race.
 The 1939 Lightweight Race is held in mixed weather conditions. On lap 2 of the Lightweight Race, Jock McCredie riding an Excelsior retires at Ballaugh with engine problems. Lap 3 and Omobono Tenni riding a Moto Guzzi stops at Ballaugh to change a spark-plug and retires and his team-mate Stanley Woods retires on lap 5 with engine problems at Crosby.

Sources

External links
 Detailed race results
 Isle of Man TT winners
 Ted Mellors winning the Lightweight TT on the Benelli image

Isle of Man TT
1939
Isle of Man